Leonard Lopp (May 1, 1888 - December 3, 1974) was an American painter and muralist of the Pacific Northwest. He exhibited his work in the United States and Canada, and he did five murals in Kalispell, Montana. His paintings were collected by President Harry Truman and FBI director J. Edgar Hoover.

Early life
Lopp was born on May 1, 1888, in Highmore, South Dakota. He was educated in public schools in Canton and Elk Point, South Dakota, and he graduated from Union College in Nebraska with a degree in Art and Public Speaking. He also studied art in Chicago and Seattle, where he attended the University of Washington.

Career
Lopp became a painter and muralist of the Pacific Northwest. He did five murals in Kalispell, Montana: four in the Conrad National Bank, and one in the Seventh-Day Adventist Church. He was a member of the Montana Institute of the Arts, and he exhibited his work in the United States and Canada. His paintings often came in handmade frames. Lopp also restored paintings in the C. M. Russell Museum Complex in Great Falls, Montana.

Notable collectors included President Harry Truman and FBI director J. Edgar Hoover.

Personal life and death
Lopp was married twice. His first wife was Margaret Booth and his second wife, Louise Lopp. He had a son, Robert.

Lopp died on December 3, 1974, in Kalispell, Montana. His funeral was held at the Seventh-Day Adventist Church, and he was buried in the C. E. Conrad Memorial Cemetery.

References

1888 births
1974 deaths
People from Hyde County, South Dakota
People from Kalispell, Montana
Union College (Nebraska) alumni
20th-century American painters
American muralists
Artists from Montana
Artists of the American West